Kurt Turns Evil is a 2008 3D computer-animated children's film directed by Rasmus A. Sivertsen—in his directorial debut as sole director—from a screenplay by Per Schreiner and Karsten Fullu, based on the 1995 book of the same name by Erlend Loe. A co-production between the Danish Nordisk Film and Norwegian Qvisten Animation, Kurt Turns Evil was produced by Cornelia Boysen and Ove Heiborg. It was released in Norway on 31 October 2008 and grossed $902,697.

Voice cast 
The voice cast, per the Norwegian Film Institute:
Atle Antonsen as Kurt
Aksel Hennie as Bud
Fredrik Steen as the doctor
Anders Bye as Bruse Kurt
Pernille Sørensen as Tykke Helena and the Prime Minister:
Paul-Ottar Haga as the Policeman
Jon Øigarden as Dr. Petter
Kristin Skogheim as Anne-Lise

Release 
Kurt Turns Evil was released in Norwegian cinemas on 31 October 2008. It grossed $227,997 in its opening weekend, for a total box office gross of $902,697.

Notes

References

External links 

2008 films
2008 computer-animated films
2008 3D films
2000s Norwegian-language films
Danish animated films
Norwegian animated films
Danish children's films
Norwegian children's films
Films directed by Rasmus A. Sivertsen